State Road 271 (NM 271) is a  state highway in the US state of New Mexico. NM 271's southern terminus is at the end of state maintenance at the Mora/ San Miguel County line, and the northern terminus is at NM 120 in Wagon Mound.

Major intersections

See also

References

271
Transportation in Mora County, New Mexico